The Nika Award for Best Picture is given annually by the Russian Academy of Cinema Arts and Science and presented at the Nika Awards.

This award goes to the producers and directors of the Russian film.

In the following lists, the titles and names in bold with a light blue background are the winners and recipients respectively; those not in bold are the nominees.

Winners and nominees

1980s

1990s

2000s

2010s

2020s

References

External links
 

Nika Awards
Awards for best film
Lists of films by award